Saccharedens is a sugar-degrading genus of bacteria from the family of Alcaligenaceae with one known species (Saccharedens versatilis).

References

 

Burkholderiales
Bacteria genera
Monotypic bacteria genera